The 1920 All-Pacific Coast football team consists of American football players chosen by various organizations for All-Pacific Coast teams for the 1920 college football season.

All-Pacific Coast selections

Quarterback
 Charles F. Erb, California (AS-1)
 Bill Steers, Oregon (ODJ-1)

Halfbacks
 Pesky Sprott, California (AS-1, ODJ-1)
 Crip Toomey, California (AS-1)
 Dink Templeton, Stanford (ODJ-1)

Fullback
 Jesse B. Morrison, California (AS-1)
 Lloyd Gillis, Washington State (ODJ-1)

Ends
 Robert A. Berkey, California (AS-1)
 Harold Muller, California (AS-1, ODJ-1)
 Martin Howard, Oregon (ODJ-1)

Tackles
 Stanley Barnes, California (AS-1)
 Dan McMillan, California (AS-1)
 E. Leslie, Oregon (ODJ-1)
 Fred Hamilton, Washington State (ODJ-1)

Guards
 Olin C. Majors, California (AS-1, ODJ-1)
 Lee D. Cranmer, California (AS-1)
 Carl Mautz, Oregon (ODJ-1)

Centers
 George H. Latham, California (AS-1)
 Earl Dunlap, Washington State (ODJ-1)

Key

AS = Andy Smith, head coach of California, picking all 11 first-team players from his own squad

ODJ = Oregon Daily Journal

See also
1920 College Football All-America Team

References

All-Pacific Coast Football Team
All-Pacific Coast football teams
All-Pac-12 Conference football teams